Who's Who (or Who is Who) is the title of a number of reference publications, generally containing concise biographical information on the prominent people of a country. The title has been adopted as an expression meaning a group of notable persons. The oldest and best-known is the annual publication Who's Who, a reference work on contemporary prominent people in Britain published annually since 1849.

In addition to legitimate reference works, some Who's Who lists involve the selling of "memberships" in fraudulent directories that are created online or through instant publishing services.  AARP, the University at Buffalo and the Government of South Australia have published warnings of these Who's Who scams.

Notable examples by country
 Who's Who, the oldest listing of prominent British people since 1849; people who have died since 1897 are listed in Who Was Who.
 Cambridge Who's Who (also known as Worldwide Who's Who), a vanity publisher based in Uniondale, New York.
 Marquis Who's Who, a series of books published since 1899 by Marquis, primarily listing prominent American people, but including Who's Who in the World.
 Who's Who in New Zealand, twelve editions published at irregular intervals between 1908 and 1991
 Canadian Who's Who, a listing of prominent Canadians since 1910
 Who's Who in Switzerland, published from 1953 to 1996 and then Swiss Who's Who, a listing of prominent Swiss or leading figures living in Switzerland since 2015
 Who's Who in Australia, a listing of prominent Australians since 1923
 Who's Who in France, a listing of prominent French or people living in France since 1953 
 Who's Who in Scotland, a listing of prominent Scots since 1986
 Who's Who, by Metron Publications, a listing of prominent Greeks since 1992
 Who's Who of Southern Africa, published in paper form until 2007 when it was replaced by a website

Non-English publications 

Some Who's Who books have a title in the language of the country concerned:
 Croatian: Tko je tko u Hrvatskoj, bilingual edition (1993)
 Danish: Kraks Blå Bog (since 1910) annually
 Finnish: Kuka kukin on (since 1909) at first irregularly, every fourth year since 1970
 German: Wer ist's?
 German: for East Germany: 
 Japanese: Nihon Tarento Meikan (Talent Who's Who in Japan), a listing of Japanese celebrities, or tarentos, since 1970
 Lithuanian:  (Who's Who in Lithuania), a listing of prominent Lithuanians and business companies since 1995.
 Norwegian: Hvem er Hvem? (since 1912) 14 editions in the 20th century
 Swedish: Vem är det (since 1912) every second year

Specialised publications
 International Who's Who by Europa Publications, a Taylor and Francis imprint
 Who's Who Among American High School Students listing what it deems to be American high school and college students who particularly excel in the realm of academic achievement. The publishing company closed in 2007.
 Who's Who in American Art, a listing of prominent American artists
 Who's Who in British History
 Who's Who in the CIA, a book published in East Berlin in 1968 with the assistance of the KGB and the HVA purporting to reveal the identities of thousands of CIA officers.
 Who's Who in the DC Universe a listing of DC Comics characters
 Who's Who in the Theatre, published in Britain and the US from 1912 to 1982

Other publications and scams
The title "Who's Who" is in the public domain, and thousands of Who's Who compilations of varying scope and quality (and similar publications without the words "Who's Who") have been published by various authors and publishers. Some publications have been described as scams; they list any people likely to buy the book, or to pay for inclusion, with no criterion of genuine notability. They may offer vanity awards or expensive trophies.

One example was the Who's Who Among American High School Students which was criticized for questionable nomination practices as well as whether the listing's entries are fact-checked and accurate. According to the admissions vice president of Hamline University, "It's honestly something that an admissions officer typically wouldn't consider or wouldn't play into an admissions decision," adding that "Who's Who... is just trying to sell books".

Who's Who publications are not all of questionable value, but publishers that select truly notable people and provide trustworthy information on them are hard to identify. A & C Black's Who's Who is the canonical example of a legitimate Who's Who reference work, being the first to use the name and establish the approach in print, publishing annually since 1849. However, the longevity of a publication is not in itself a guarantee. In 1999 Tucker Carlson said in Forbes magazine that Marquis Who's Who, founded in 1898 but no longer an independent company, had adopted practices of address harvesting as a revenue stream, undermining its claim to legitimacy as a reference work listing people of merit. A 2005 New York Times article observed that the entries in Marquis Who's Who were "not uniformly fact-checked".

See also
 Biographical dictionary
 Hinterland Who's Who, a series of 60-second public service ads profiling Canadian animals and birds, produced by Environment Canada in the 1960s
 Kdo byl kdo (Czech: "Who was who?")

References

Lists of books by type
Biographical dictionaries